Kudakwashe Donald Samunderu, born 12 July 1987 in Harare, Kuda is an accomplished batting all-rounder who represented the Zimbabwe Under-19s before moving to South Africa where he plays Premier cricket for Durbanville in Cape Town.A right-hand opening batsman and off-spin bowler Samunderu is a hard-working cricketer who made his first-class debut in 2004 as a 16-year-old in Zimbabwe's Logan Cup competition. He made an immediate impression and was called up to the national ODI squad that faced England the same year. Although he did not feature, Samunderu was later included in the Zimbabwe side for the ICC Under-19 Afro/Asia tournament in India the following year, where he finished third on run aggregates. In 2006, he starred for Zimbabwe during the ICC Under-19 World Cup in Sri Lanka helping his team to the quarter-finals only to lose out to eventual winners Pakistan. Samunderu struck half centuries against Pakistan and Ireland respectively and along with 7 wickets, he earned himself fifth place in the player of the tournament standings courtesy of two man-of-the-match performances. Samunderu was rewarded for his exploits with a full bursary from Sports Skills for Life Skills NGO (ss4ls.org.za) based at the prestigious University of The Western Cape (currently coached by former Black Caps coach Andy Moles).He spent the next five years training at this world class facility whilst also completing a Bachelor of Arts degree, then later a Post Graduate Certificate in Education. During this period, Samunderu was part of the UWC side that dominated the WPCA 1A Competition – winning the 2-Day Competition 3 times in four seasons along with one-day and T20 titles. After completing his studies, Samunderu set his sights on playing professional cricket in South Africa and potentially a return to Zimbabwe. Samunderu was signed by Durbanville Cricket Club at the start of 2012 and has continued to impress, both on and off the field.

He is also known as Kuda Samunderu.

In April 2013 he signed for Nettleham CC, who play in the Lincolnshire ECB Premier league as their overseas player for the 2013 season.

References

1987 births
Living people
Zimbabwean cricketers
Mashonaland cricketers